Hung at Heart is the third studio album by the Southern California surf rock band The Growlers, released on January 22, 2013 by Everloving Records. The album garnered generally positive reviews from critics, with Alejandro Rubio of Filter describing it as "a sketchy Tijuana pharmacy that’s got a little “something” for everybody." The album was originally going to be produced by The Black Keys lead singer and guitarist Dan Auerbach, but due to the band's dissatisfaction with the final product, it was self-produced.

Track listing

Chart performance

References

2013 albums
The Growlers albums